Stephen Moore, 1st Viscount Mount Cashell (1696 – 26 February 1766), known as The Lord Kilworth between 1764 and 1766, was an Irish politician.

Moore was the son of Richard Moore, of Cashell, County Tipperary, by the Honourable Elizabeth Ponsonby, daughter of William Ponsonby, 1st Viscount Duncannon. He was returned to the Irish House of Commons for County Tipperary in 1738, a seat he held until 1761. In 1764 he was raised to the Peerage of Ireland as Baron Kilworth, of Moore Park in the County of Cork. Two years later he was further honoured when he was made Viscount Mount Cashell, of the City of Cashell, also in the Irish peerage.

Lord Mount Cashell married Alicia Colville, daughter of Hugh Colville and  Sarah  Margetson, and granddaughter of Sir Robert Colville and his third wife Rose Leslie. They had several children. Their eldest son, Richard Moore, represented Clonmel in the Irish Parliament while a younger son, the Honourable William Moore represented Clogher, Clonmel and St Johnstown. Lord Mount Cashell died in February 1766 (only a month after being elevated to the viscountcy) and was succeeded by his eldest surviving son, Stephen, who was created Earl Mount Cashell in 1781.

References

|-

1696 births
1766 deaths
Irish MPs 1727–1760
Viscounts in the Peerage of Ireland
Peers of Ireland created by George III
Members of the Parliament of Ireland (pre-1801) for County Tipperary constituencies
People from Cashel, County Tipperary